Smerek  (Smerek) is a village in the administrative district of Gmina Cisna, within Lesko County, Subcarpathian Voivodeship, in south-eastern Poland, close to the border with Slovakia.

The village has a population of 100.
Its station is a terminus of the Bieszczadzka Forest Railway.

References

Smerek